XHQE-FM is a radio station on 94.3 FM in Escuinapa, Sinaloa. It is known as La Kañona with a grupera format.

History
XEQE-AM 1340 received its concession on August 31, 1948. It operated with 250 watts. In the 1980s, power was increased to 500 watts and again to a full 1,000 in the 1990s.

XEQE migrated to FM in 2011 as XHQE-FM 94.3.

References

Radio stations in Sinaloa